The 1929 Vermont Catamounts football team was an American football team that represented  the University of Vermont as an independent during the 1929 college football season. In their second year under head coach William V. Rattan, the team compiled a 2–7 record.

Schedule

References

Vermont
Vermont Catamounts football seasons
Vermont Catamounts football